Micropterix aureocapilla is a species of moth belonging to the family Micropterigidae. It was described by John Heath in 1986, and is known only from the type locality, El Hadjar in Algeria.

References

Micropterigidae
Endemic fauna of Algeria
Moths described in 1986
Moths of Africa
Taxa named by John Heath